John Daukom (1937 – 28 September 2010) was a Malaysian sprinter. He competed in the men's 4 × 100 metres relay at the 1964 Summer Olympics. He was the first Murut person to compete at the Olympics.

References

1937 births
2010 deaths
Athletes (track and field) at the 1964 Summer Olympics
Malaysian male sprinters
Olympic athletes of Malaysia
Place of birth missing